Danny van Trijp (born 24 December 1996) is a Dutch darts player currently playing in Professional Darts Corporation events.

Career 
He attended European Q-School in 2019, but never got farther than the last 16, missing out on a Tour Card. He did then qualify as the one of the Association Member qualifiers for the 2019 European Darts Open in Leverkusen, Germany. However, he lost 6–3 to Adam Hunt in the first round.

He also qualified for the 2019 Dutch Darts Masters. In the first round he won a 6–5 victory against Keegan Brown, but was defeated 6–2 by Ricky Evans in the second round.

Danny made his Players Championship debut on 3 August 2019. He lost in the first round to David Pallett (6-5). A day later he won 6-3 against Simon Stevenson, then went down in the 2nd round against Steve Beaton (6-5).

In January 2020, Danny made another attempt to obtain a tour card. On the first day he lost in the first round to Hungarian Patrik Kovács. On day two he lost the Last 16 to the Swede Daniel Larsson. On Day 3, he lost the last 64 to New Zealander Cody Harris. On the last day Danny reached the semi-finals where he lost to German Steffen Siepmann.

Danny made his UK Open debut on 6 March 2020. In the first round he got Russia's number 1 Boris Koltsov. This match was won 6-4 with an average of 86. In the second round Danny was defeated 6-0 by the Scottish William Borland.

World Championship results

PDC
 2023: Second round (lost to Jonny Clayton 0–3)

References

External links

Dutch darts players
Professional Darts Corporation current tour card holders
Living people
1996 births